The 1954 United States House of Representatives elections in South Carolina were held on November 2, 1954 to select six Representatives for two-year terms from the state of South Carolina.  The primary elections were held on July 13.  All six incumbents were re-elected and the composition of the state delegation remained solely Democratic.

1st congressional district
Incumbent Democratic Congressman L. Mendel Rivers of the 1st congressional district, in office since 1941, defeated Republican challenger Mrs. John E. Messervy.

General election results

|-
| 
| colspan=5 |Democratic hold
|-

2nd congressional district
Incumbent Democratic Congressman John J. Riley of the 2nd congressional district, in office since 1951, defeated Republican challenger I.S. Leevy.

General election results

|-
| 
| colspan=5 |Democratic hold
|-

3rd congressional district
Incumbent Democratic Congressman William Jennings Bryan Dorn of the 3rd congressional district, in office since 1951, defeated Republican challenger C.M. Smith.

General election results

|-
| 
| colspan=5 |Democratic hold
|-

4th congressional district
Incumbent Democratic Congressman Robert T. Ashmore of the 4th congressional district, in office since 1953, defeated Republican challenger Lena Bellotte.

Democratic primary

General election results

|-
| 
| colspan=5 |Democratic hold
|-

5th congressional district
Incumbent Democratic Congressman James P. Richards of the 5th congressional district, in office since 1933, defeated Wade S. Weatherford in the Democratic primary and was unopposed in the general election.

Democratic primary

General election results

|-
| 
| colspan=5 |Democratic hold
|-

6th congressional district
Incumbent Democratic Congressman John L. McMillan of the 6th congressional district, in office since 1939, defeated Republican challenger Vernon Johnson.

General election results

|-
| 
| colspan=5 |Democratic hold
|-

See also
United States House of Representatives elections, 1954
United States Senate election in South Carolina, 1954
South Carolina gubernatorial election, 1954
South Carolina's congressional districts

References

South Carolina
United States House of Representatives
1954